Jews or Jewish people are an ethnoreligious group and nation originating from the Israelites and Hebrews of historical Israel and Judah. Jewish ethnicity, nationhood, and religion are strongly interrelated, as Judaism is the ethnic religion of the Jewish people, although its observance varies from strict to none.

Jews originated as an ethnic and religious group in the Middle East during the second millennium BCE, in a part of the Levant known as the Land of Israel. The Merneptah Stele of ancient Egypt appears to confirm the existence of a people of Israel somewhere in Canaan as far back as the 13th century BCE (Late Bronze Age). The Israelites, as an outgrowth of the Canaanite population, consolidated their hold in the region with the emergence of the kingdoms of Israel and Judah. Some consider that these Canaan-sedentary Israelites melded with incoming nomadic groups known as the "Hebrews". The experience of life in the Jewish diaspora, from the Babylonian captivity and exile (though few sources mention this period in detail) to the Roman occupation and exile, and the historical relations between Jews and their homeland in the Levant thereafter became a major feature of Jewish history, identity, culture, and memory.

In the following millennia, Jewish diaspora communities coalesced into three major ethnic subdivisions according to where their ancestors settled: the Ashkenazim (Central and Eastern Europe), the Sephardim (initially in the Iberian Peninsula), and the Mizrahim (Middle East and North Africa). Prior to World War II, the global Jewish population reached a peak of 16.7 million, representing around 0.7 percent of the world population at that time. During World War II, approximately 6 million Jews throughout Europe were systematically murdered by Nazi Germany during the Holocaust. The modern State of Israel is the only country where Jews form a majority of the population.

Jews have significantly influenced and contributed to human progress in many fields, both historically and in modern times, including in science and technology, philosophy, ethics, literature, politics, business, art, music, comedy, theatre, cinema, architecture, food, medicine, and religion. Jews wrote the Bible, founded Christianity, and had an indirect but profound influence on Islam. In these ways, Jews have also played a significant role in the development of Western culture.

Name and etymology 

The English word "Jew" continues Middle English . The Greek term was a loan from Aramaic , corresponding to Hebrew  , originally the term for the people of the kingdom of Judah. According to the Hebrew Bible, the name of both the tribe of Judah and the kingdom of Judah derive from Judah, the fourth son of Jacob. Genesis 29:35 and 49:8 connect the name "Judah" with the verb , meaning "praise", but scholars generally agree that the name of both the patriarch and the kingdom instead have a geographic origin—possibly referring to the gorges and ravines of the region.

Endonyms in other Jewish languages include the Ladino   (plural) and the Yiddish   (plural  ).

The etymological equivalent is in use in other languages, e.g., يَهُودِيّ yahūdī (sg.), al-yahūd (pl.), in Arabic, "Jude" in German, "judeu" in Portuguese, "Juif" (m.)/"Juive" (f.) in French, "jøde" in Danish and Norwegian, "judío/a" in Spanish, "jood" in Dutch, "żyd" in Polish etc., but derivations of the word "Hebrew" are also in use to describe a Jew, e.g., in Italian (Ebreo), in Persian ("Ebri/Ebrani") and Russian (Еврей, Yevrey). The German word "Jude" is pronounced , the corresponding adjective "jüdisch"  (Jewish) is the origin of the word "Yiddish".

According to The American Heritage Dictionary of the English Language, fourth edition (2000),
It is widely recognized that the attributive use of the noun Jew, in phrases such as Jew lawyer or Jew ethics, is both vulgar and highly offensive. In such contexts Jewish is the only acceptable possibility. Some people, however, have become so wary of this construction that they have extended the stigma to any use of Jew as a noun, a practice that carries risks of its own. In a sentence such as There are now several Jews on the council, which is unobjectionable, the substitution of a circumlocution like Jewish people or persons of Jewish background may in itself cause offense for seeming to imply that Jew has a negative connotation when used as a noun.

Identity 

Judaism shares some of the characteristics of a nation, an ethnicity, a religion, and a culture, making the definition of who is a Jew vary slightly depending on whether a religious or national approach to identity is used. Generally, in modern secular usage, Jews include three groups: people who were born to a Jewish family regardless of whether or not they follow the religion, those who have some Jewish ancestral background or lineage (sometimes including those who do not have strictly matrilineal descent), and people without any Jewish ancestral background or lineage who have formally converted to Judaism and therefore are followers of the religion.

Historical definitions of Jewish identity have traditionally been based on halakhic definitions of matrilineal descent, and halakhic conversions. These definitions of who is a Jew date back to the codification of the Oral Torah into the Babylonian Talmud, around 200 CE. A popular theory is that the rape of Jewish women in captivity brought about the law of Jewish identity being inherited through the maternal line, although scholars challenge this theory citing the Talmudic establishment of the law from the pre-exile period. Another argument is that the rabbis changed the law of patrilineal descent to matrilineal descent due to the widespread rape of Jewish women by Roman soldiers. Since the anti-religious Haskalah movement of the late 18th and 19th centuries, halakhic interpretations of Jewish identity have been challenged.

According to historian Shaye J. D. Cohen, the status of the offspring of mixed marriages was determined patrilineally in the Bible. He brings two likely explanations for the change in Mishnaic times: first, the Mishnah may have been applying the same logic to mixed marriages as it had applied to other mixtures (Kil'ayim). Thus, a mixed marriage is forbidden as is the union of a horse and a donkey, and in both unions the offspring are judged matrilineally. Second, the Tannaim may have been influenced by Roman law, which dictated that when a parent could not contract a legal marriage, offspring would follow the mother. Rabbi Rivon Krygier follows a similar reasoning, arguing that Jewish descent had formerly passed through the patrilineal descent and the law of matrilineal descent had its roots in the Roman legal system.

Origins 

A factual reconstruction for the origin of the Jews is a difficult and complex endeavor. It requires examining at least 3,000 years of ancient human history using documents in vast quantities and variety, written in at least ten Near Eastern languages. As archaeological discovery relies upon researchers and scholars from diverse disciplines, the goal is to interpret all of the factual data, focusing on the most consistent theory. The prehistory and ethnogenesis of the Jews are closely intertwined with archaeology, biology, and historical textual records, as well as religious literature and mythology. The ethnic stock to which Jews originally trace their ancestry was a confederation of Iron Age Semitic-speaking tribes known as the Israelites that inhabited a part of Canaan during the tribal and monarchic periods. Modern Jews are named after and also descended from the southern Israelite Kingdom of Judah.

According to the Hebrew Bible narrative, Jewish ancestry is traced back to the Biblical patriarchs such as Abraham, his son Isaac, Isaac's son Jacob, and the Biblical matriarchs Sarah, Rebecca, Leah, and Rachel, who lived in Canaan. The Twelve Tribes are described as descending from the twelve sons of Jacob. Jacob and his family migrated to Ancient Egypt after being invited to live with Jacob's son Joseph by the Pharaoh himself. The patriarchs' descendants were later enslaved until the Exodus led by Moses, after which the Israelites conquered Canaan under Moses' successor Joshua, went through the period of the Biblical judges after the death of Joshua, then through the mediation of Samuel became subject to a king, Saul, who was succeeded by David and then Solomon, after whom the United Monarchy ended and was split into a separate Kingdom of Israel and a Kingdom of Judah. The Kingdom of Judah is described as comprising the Tribe of Judah, the Tribe of Benjamin, partially the Tribe of Levi, and later adding remnants of other tribes who migrated there from the Kingdom of Israel. Modern Jews claim lineage from those tribes since the ten northern tribes were lost following Assyrian captivity.

Modern archaeology and the current historical view has largely discarded the historicity of this narrative. It has been reframed as constituting the Israelites' inspiring national myth narrative. The Israelites and their culture, according to the modern archaeological and historical account, did not overtake the region by force, but instead branched out of the Canaanite peoples and culture through the development of a distinct monolatristic—and later monotheistic—religion of Yahwism centered on Yahweh, one of the gods of the Canaanite pantheon. The growth of Yahweh-centric belief, along with a number of cultic practices, gradually gave rise to a distinct Israelite ethnic group, setting them apart from other Canaanites.

The Israelites become visible in the historical record as a people between 1200 and 1000 BCE. It is not certain if a period like that of the Biblical judges occurred nor if there was ever a United Monarchy. There is well accepted archeological evidence referring to "Israel" in the Merneptah Stele, which dates to about 1200 BCE, and the Canaanites are archeologically attested in the Middle Bronze Age. There is debate about the earliest existence of the Kingdoms of Israel and Judah and their extent and power, but historians agree that a Kingdom of Israel existed by c. 900 BCE and that a Kingdom of Judah existed by c. 700 BCE. It is widely accepted that the Kingdom of Israel was destroyed around 720 BCE, when it was conquered by the Neo-Assyrian Empire.

History 

The term Jew originated from the Roman "Judean" and denoted someone from the southern kingdom of Judah. The shift of ethnonym from "Israelites" to "Jews" (inhabitant of Judah), although not contained in the Torah, is made explicit in the Book of Esther (4th century BCE), a book in the Ketuvim, the third section of the Jewish Tanakh. In 587 BCE Nebuchadnezzar II, King of the Neo-Babylonian Empire, besieged Jerusalem, destroyed the First Temple and deported the most prominent citizens of Judah.

According to the Book of Ezra, the Persian Cyrus the Great ended the Babylonian exile in 538 BCE, the year after he captured Babylon. The exile ended with the return under Zerubbabel the Prince (so-called because he was a descendant of the royal line of David) and Joshua the Priest (a descendant of the line of the former High Priests of the Temple) and their construction of the Second Temple in the period 521–516 BCE. The Cyrus Cylinder, an ancient tablet on which is written a declaration in the name of Cyrus referring to restoration of temples and repatriation of exiled peoples, has often been taken as corroboration of the authenticity of the biblical decrees attributed to Cyrus, but other scholars point out that the cylinder's text is specific to Babylon and Mesopotamia and makes no mention of Judah or Jerusalem. Professor Lester L. Grabbe asserted that the "alleged decree of Cyrus" regarding Judah, "cannot be considered authentic", but that there was a "general policy of allowing deportees to return and to re-establish cult sites". He also stated that archaeology suggests that the return was a "trickle" taking place over decades, rather than a single event. By the 4th century BCE, the majority of Jews lived outside the land of Israel.

As part of the Persian Empire, the former Kingdom of Judah became the province of Judah (Yehud Medinata) with different borders, covering a smaller territory. The population of the province was greatly reduced from that of the kingdom, archaeological surveys showing a population of around 30,000 people in the 5th to 4th centuries BCE. The region was under control of the Achaemenids until the fall of their empire in c. 333 BCE to Alexander the Great. Jews were also politically independent during the Hasmonean dynasty spanning from 110 to 63 BCE and to some degree under the Herodian dynasty from 37 BCE to 6 CE.

Genetic studies on Jews show that most Jews worldwide bear a common genetic heritage which originates in the Middle East, and that they share certain genetic traits with other Gentile peoples of the Fertile Crescent. The genetic composition of different Jewish groups shows that Jews share a common gene pool dating back four millennia, as a marker of their common ancestral origin. Despite their long-term separation, Jewish communities maintained their unique commonalities, propensities, and sensibilities in culture, tradition, and language.

Babylon and Rome 

After the destruction of the Second Temple, Judaism lost much of its sectarian nature.

Without a Temple, Greek-speaking Jews no longer looked to Jerusalem in the way they had before. Judaism separated into a linguistically Greek and a Hebrew / Aramaic sphere. The theology and religious texts of each community were distinctively different. Hellenized Judaism never developed yeshivas to study the Oral Law. Rabbinic Judaism (centered in the Land of Israel and Babylon) almost entirely ignores the Hellenized Diaspora in its writings. Hellenized Judaism eventually disappeared as its practitioners assimilated into Greco-Roman culture, leaving a strong Rabbinic eastern Diaspora with large centers of learning in Babylon.

By the first century, the Jewish community in Babylonia, to which Jews were exiled after the Babylonian conquest as well as after the Bar Kokhba revolt in 135 CE, already held a speedily growing population of an estimated one million Jews, which increased to an estimated two million between the years 200 CE and 500 CE, both by natural growth and by immigration of more Jews from the Land of Israel, making up about one-sixth of the world Jewish population at that era. The 13th-century author Bar Hebraeus gave a figure of 6,944,000 Jews in the Roman world; Salo Wittmayer Baron considered the figure convincing. The figure of seven million within and one million outside the Roman world in the mid-first century became widely accepted, including by Louis Feldman.

However, contemporary scholars now accept that Bar Hebraeus based his figure on a census of total Roman citizens, the figure of 6,944,000 being recorded in Eusebius' Chronicon. Louis Feldman, previously an active supporter of the figure, now states that he and Baron were mistaken. Feldman's views on active Jewish missionizing have also changed. While viewing classical Judaism as being receptive to converts, especially from the second century BCE through the first century CE, he points to a lack of either missionizing tracts or records of the names of rabbis who sought converts as evidence for the lack of active Jewish missionizing. Feldman maintains that conversion to Judaism was common and the Jewish population was large both within the Land of Israel and in the Diaspora. Other historians believe that conversion during the Roman era was limited in number and did not account for much of the Jewish population growth, due to various factors such as the illegality of male conversion to Judaism in the Roman world from the mid-second century. Another factor that made conversion difficult in the Roman world was the halakhic requirement of circumcision, a requirement that proselytizing Christianity quickly dropped. The Fiscus Judaicus, a tax imposed on Jews in 70 CE and relaxed to exclude Christians in 96 CE, also limited Judaism's appeal.

Diaspora 

Following the Roman conquest of Judea and the siege of Jerusalem in 70 CE, hundreds of thousands of Jews were taken as slaves to Rome, where they later immigrated to other European lands. The Jews who immigrated to Iberia and North Africa comprise the Sephardic Jews, while those who immigrated to the Rhineland and France comprise the Ashkenazi Jews. Additionally both before and after the Roman conquest of Judea many Jews lived in Persia and Babylon as well as other Middle eastern countries, these Jews comprise the Mizrachi Jews. In Francia, Jews like Isaac Judaeus and Armentarius occupied prominent social and economic positions, as opposed to in Spain, where Jews were persecuted under Visigoth rule. In Babylon, from the 7th to 11th centuries the Pumbedita and Sura academies lead the Arab and to an extant the entire Jewish world. The deans and students of said academies defined the Geonic period in Jewish history. Following this period were the Rishonim who lived from the 11th to 15th centuries, it was during this time that the Ashkenazi Jews began experiencing extreme persecution in France and especially the Rhineland, which resulted in mass immigration to Poland and Lithuania. Meanwhile, Sephardic Jews experienced a golden age under Muslim rule, however following the Reconquista and subsequent Alhambra decree in 1492, most of the Spanish Jewish population immigrated to North Africa and the Ottoman Empire. However some Jews chose to remain and pretended to practice Catholicism. These Jews would form the members of Crypto-Judaism.

Culture

Religion 

The Jewish people and the religion of Judaism are strongly interrelated. Converts to Judaism typically have a status within the Jewish ethnos equal to those born into it. However, several converts to Judaism, as well as ex-Jews, have claimed that converts are treated as second-class Jews by many born Jews.
Conversion is not encouraged by mainstream Judaism, and it is considered a difficult task. A significant portion of conversions are undertaken by children of mixed marriages, or would-be or current spouses of Jews.

The Hebrew Bible, a religious interpretation of the traditions and early history of the Jews, established the first of the Abrahamic religions, which are now practiced by 54 percent of the world. Judaism guides its adherents in both practice and belief, and has been called not only a religion, but also a "way of life," which has made drawing a clear distinction between Judaism, Jewish culture, and Jewish identity rather difficult. Throughout history, in eras and places as diverse as the ancient Hellenic world, in Europe before and after The Age of Enlightenment (see Haskalah), in Islamic Spain and Portugal, in North Africa and the Middle East, India, China, or the contemporary United States and Israel, cultural phenomena have developed that are in some sense characteristically Jewish without being at all specifically religious. Some factors in this come from within Judaism, others from the interaction of Jews or specific communities of Jews with their surroundings, and still others from the inner social and cultural dynamics of the community, as opposed to from the religion itself. This phenomenon has led to considerably different Jewish cultures unique to their own communities.

Languages 

Hebrew is the liturgical language of Judaism (termed lashon ha-kodesh, "the holy tongue"), the language in which most of the Hebrew scriptures (Tanakh) were composed, and the daily speech of the Jewish people for centuries. By the 5th century BCE, Aramaic, a closely related tongue, joined Hebrew as the spoken language in Judea. By the 3rd century BCE, some Jews of the diaspora were speaking Greek. Others, such as in the Jewish communities of Asoristan, known to Jews as Babylonia, were speaking Hebrew and Aramaic, the languages of the Babylonian Talmud. Dialects of these same languages were also used by the Jews of Syria Palaestina at that time.

For centuries, Jews worldwide have spoken the local or dominant languages of the regions they migrated to, often developing distinctive dialectal forms or branches that became independent languages. Yiddish is the Judaeo-German language developed by Ashkenazi Jews who migrated to Central Europe. Ladino is the Judaeo-Spanish language developed by Sephardic Jews who migrated to the Iberian peninsula. Due to many factors, including the impact of the Holocaust on European Jewry, the Jewish exodus from Arab and Muslim countries, and widespread emigration from other Jewish communities around the world, ancient and distinct Jewish languages of several communities, including Judaeo-Georgian, Judaeo-Arabic, Judaeo-Berber, Krymchak, Judaeo-Malayalam and many others, have largely fallen out of use.

For over sixteen centuries Hebrew was used almost exclusively as a liturgical language, and as the language in which most books had been written on Judaism, with a few speaking only Hebrew on the Sabbath. Hebrew was revived as a spoken language by Eliezer ben Yehuda, who arrived in Palestine in 1881. It had not been used as a mother tongue since Tannaic times. Modern Hebrew is designated as the "State language" of Israel.

Despite efforts to revive Hebrew as the national language of the Jewish people, knowledge of the language is not commonly possessed by Jews worldwide and English has emerged as the lingua franca of the Jewish diaspora. Although many Jews once had sufficient knowledge of Hebrew to study the classic literature, and Jewish languages like Yiddish and Ladino were commonly used as recently as the early 20th century, most Jews lack such knowledge today and English has by and large superseded most Jewish vernaculars.
The three most commonly spoken languages among Jews today are Hebrew, English, and Russian. Some Romance languages, particularly French and Spanish, are also widely used. Yiddish has been spoken by more Jews in history than any other language,<ref>Hebrew, Aramaic and the rise of Yiddish. D. Katz. (1985) Readings in the sociology of Jewish languages'</ref> but it is far less used today following the Holocaust and the adoption of Modern Hebrew by the Zionist movement and the State of Israel.
In some places, the mother language of the Jewish community differs from that of the general population or the dominant group. For example, in Quebec, the Ashkenazic majority has adopted English, while the Sephardic minority uses French as its primary language. Similarly, South African Jews adopted English rather than Afrikaans. Due to both Czarist and Soviet policies, Russian has superseded Yiddish as the language of Russian Jews, but these policies have also affected neighboring communities. Today, Russian is the first language for many Jewish communities in a number of Post-Soviet states, such as Ukraine and Uzbekistan, as well as for Ashkenazic Jews in Azerbaijan, Georgia, and Tajikistan. Although communities in North Africa today are small and dwindling, Jews there had shifted from a multilingual group to a monolingual one (or nearly so), speaking French in Algeria, Morocco, and the city of Tunis, while most North Africans continue to use Arabic or Berber as their mother tongue.

 Leadership 

There is no single governing body for the Jewish community, nor a single authority with responsibility for religious doctrine. Instead, a variety of secular and religious institutions at the local, national, and international levels lead various parts of the Jewish community on a variety of issues. Today, many countries have a Chief Rabbi who serves as a representative of that country's Jewry. Although many Hassidic Jews follow a certain hereditary Hasidic dynasty, there is no one commonly accepted leader of all Hasidic Jews. Many Jews believe that the Messiah will act a unifying leader for Jews and the entire world.

Theories on ancient Jewish national identity

A number of modern scholars of nationalism support the existence of Jewish national identity in antiquity. One of them is David Goodblatt, who generally believes in the existence of nationalism before the modern period. In his view, the Bible, the parabiblical literature and the Jewish national history provide the base for a Jewish collective identity. Although many of the ancient Jews were illiterate (as were their neighbors), their national narrative was reinforced through public readings, a common practice in the ancient eastern Mediterranean area. The Hebrew language also constructed and preserved national identity. Although it was not spoken by most of the Jews after the 5th century BCE, Goodblatt contends that:Adam L. Porter, Illinois College, review of Goodblatt, David M., Elements of ancient Jewish nationalism, 2006 , in Journal of Hebrew Scriptures – Volume 9 (2009)

It is believed that Jewish nationalist sentiment in antiquity was encouraged because under foreign rule (Persians, Greeks, Romans) Jews were able to claim that they were an ancient nation. This claim was based on the preservation and reverence of their scriptures, the Hebrew language, the Temple and priesthood, and other traditions of their ancestors.

 Demographics 

 Ethnic divisions 

Within the world's Jewish population there are distinct ethnic divisions, most of which are primarily the result of geographic branching from an originating Israelite population, and subsequent independent evolutions. An array of Jewish communities was established by Jewish settlers in various places around the Old World, often at great distances from one another, resulting in effective and often long-term isolation. During the millennia of the Jewish diaspora the communities would develop under the influence of their local environments: political, cultural, natural, and populational. Today, manifestations of these differences among the Jews can be observed in Jewish cultural expressions of each community, including Jewish linguistic diversity, culinary preferences, liturgical practices, religious interpretations, as well as degrees and sources of genetic admixture.

Jews are often identified as belonging to one of two major groups: the Ashkenazim and the Sephardim. Ashkenazim, or "Germanics" (Ashkenaz meaning "Germany" in Hebrew), are so named denoting their German Jewish cultural and geographical origins, while Sephardim, or "Hispanics" (Sefarad meaning "Spain/Hispania" or "Iberia" in Hebrew), are so named denoting their Spanish/Portuguese Jewish cultural and geographic origins. The more common term in Israel for many of those broadly called Sephardim, is Mizrahim (lit. "Easterners", Mizrach being "East" in Hebrew), that is, in reference to the diverse collection of Middle Eastern and North African Jews who are often, as a group, referred to collectively as Sephardim (together with Sephardim proper) for liturgical reasons, although Mizrahi Jewish groups and Sephardi Jews proper are ethnically distinct.

Smaller groups include, but are not restricted to, Indian Jews such as the Bene Israel, Bnei Menashe, Cochin Jews, and Bene Ephraim; the Romaniotes of Greece; the Italian Jews ("Italkim" or "Bené Roma"); the Teimanim from Yemen; various African Jews, including most numerously the Beta Israel of Ethiopia; and Chinese Jews, most notably the Kaifeng Jews, as well as various other distinct but now almost extinct communities.

The divisions between all these groups are approximate and their boundaries are not always clear. The Mizrahim for example, are a heterogeneous collection of North African, Central Asian, Caucasian, and Middle Eastern Jewish communities that are no closer related to each other than they are to any of the earlier mentioned Jewish groups. In modern usage, however, the Mizrahim are sometimes termed Sephardi due to similar styles of liturgy, despite independent development from Sephardim proper. Thus, among Mizrahim there are Egyptian Jews, Iraqi Jews, Lebanese Jews, Kurdish Jews, Moroccan Jews, Libyan Jews, Syrian Jews, Bukharian Jews, Mountain Jews, Georgian Jews, Iranian Jews, Afghan Jews, and various others. The Teimanim from Yemen are sometimes included, although their style of liturgy is unique and they differ in respect to the admixture found among them to that found in Mizrahim. In addition, there is a differentiation made between Sephardi migrants who established themselves in the Middle East and North Africa after the expulsion of the Jews from Spain and Portugal in the 1490s and the pre-existing Jewish communities in those regions.

Ashkenazi Jews represent the bulk of modern Jewry, with at least 70 percent of Jews worldwide (and up to 90 percent prior to World War II and the Holocaust). As a result of their emigration from Europe, Ashkenazim also represent the overwhelming majority of Jews in the New World continents, in countries such as the United States, Canada, Argentina, Australia, and Brazil. In France, the immigration of Jews from Algeria (Sephardim) has led them to outnumber the Ashkenazim. Only in Israel is the Jewish population representative of all groups, a melting pot independent of each group's proportion within the overall world Jewish population.

 Genetic studies 

Y DNA studies tend to imply a small number of founders in an old population whose members parted and followed different migration paths. In most Jewish populations, these male line ancestors appear to have been mainly Middle Eastern. For example, Ashkenazi Jews share more common paternal lineages with other Jewish and Middle Eastern groups than with non-Jewish populations in areas where Jews lived in Eastern Europe, Germany, and the French Rhine Valley. This is consistent with Jewish traditions in placing most Jewish paternal origins in the region of the Middle East.

Conversely, the maternal lineages of Jewish populations, studied by looking at mitochondrial DNA, are generally more heterogeneous. Scholars such as Harry Ostrer and Raphael Falk believe this indicates that many Jewish males found new mates from European and other communities in the places where they migrated in the diaspora after fleeing ancient Israel. In contrast, Behar has found evidence that about 40 percent of Ashkenazi Jews originate maternally from just four female founders, who were of Middle Eastern origin. The populations of Sephardi and Mizrahi Jewish communities "showed no evidence for a narrow founder effect." Subsequent studies carried out by Feder et al. confirmed the large portion of non-local maternal origin among Ashkenazi Jews. Reflecting on their findings related to the maternal origin of Ashkenazi Jews, the authors conclude "Clearly, the differences between Jews and non-Jews are far larger than those observed among the Jewish communities. Hence, differences between the Jewish communities can be overlooked when non-Jews are included in the comparisons." A study showed that 7% of Ashkenazi Jews have the haplogroup G2c, which is mainly found in Pashtuns and on lower scales all major Jewish groups, Palestinians, Syrians, and Lebanese.

Studies of autosomal DNA, which look at the entire DNA mixture, have become increasingly important as the technology develops. They show that Jewish populations have tended to form relatively closely related groups in independent communities, with most in a community sharing significant ancestry in common. For Jewish populations of the diaspora, the genetic composition of Ashkenazi, Sephardic, and Mizrahi Jewish populations show a predominant amount of shared Middle Eastern ancestry. According to Behar, the most parsimonious explanation for this shared Middle Eastern ancestry is that it is "consistent with the historical formulation of the Jewish people as descending from ancient Hebrew and Israelite residents of the Levant" and "the dispersion of the people of ancient Israel throughout the Old World". North African, Italian and others of Iberian origin show variable frequencies of admixture with non-Jewish historical host populations among the maternal lines. In the case of Ashkenazi and Sephardi Jews (in particular Moroccan Jews), who are closely related, the source of non-Jewish admixture is mainly Southern European, while Mizrahi Jews show evidence of admixture with other Middle Eastern populations. Behar et al. have remarked on a close relationship between Ashkenazi Jews and modern Italians. A 2001 study found that Jews were more closely related to groups of the Fertile Crescent (Kurds, Turks, and Armenians) than to their Arab neighbors, whose genetic signature was found in geographic patterns reflective of Islamic conquests.

The studies also show that Sephardic Bnei Anusim (descendants of the "anusim" who were forced to convert to Catholicism), which comprise up to 19.8 percent of the population of today's Iberia (Spain and Portugal) and at least 10 percent of the population of Ibero-America (Hispanic America and Brazil), have Sephardic Jewish ancestry within the last few centuries. The Bene Israel and Cochin Jews of India, Beta Israel of Ethiopia, and a portion of the Lemba people of Southern Africa, despite more closely resembling the local populations of their native countries, have also been thought to have some more remote ancient Jewish ancestry. Views on the Lemba have changed and genetic Y-DNA analyses in the 2000s have established a partially Middle-Eastern origin for a portion of the male Lemba population but have been unable to narrow this down further.

 Population centers 

Although historically, Jews have been found all over the world, in the decades since World War II and the establishment of Israel, they have increasingly concentrated in a small number of countries. In 2013, the United States and Israel were collectively home to more than 80 percent of the global Jewish population, each country having approximately 41 percent of the world's Jews.

According to the Israel Central Bureau of Statistics there were 13,421,000 Jews worldwide in 2009, roughly 0.19 percent of the world's population at the time.

According to the 2007 estimates of The Jewish People Policy Planning Institute, the world's Jewish population is 13.2 million. Adherents.com cites figures ranging from 12 to 18 million. These statistics incorporate both practicing Jews affiliated with synagogues and the Jewish community, and approximately 4.5 million unaffiliated and secular Jews.

According to Sergio Della Pergola, a demographer of the Jewish population, in 2015 there were about 6.3 million Jews in Israel, 5.7 million in the United States, and 2.3 million in the rest of the world.

 Israel 

Israel, the Jewish nation-state, is the only country in which Jews make up a majority of the citizens. Israel was established as an independent democratic and Jewish state on 14 May 1948. Of the 120 members in its parliament, the Knesset, 14 members of the Knesset are Arab citizens of Israel (not including the Druze), most representing Arab political parties. One of Israel's Supreme Court judges is also an Arab citizen of Israel.

Between 1948 and 1958, the Jewish population rose from 800,000 to two million. Currently, Jews account for 75.4 percent of the Israeli population, or 6 million people. The early years of the State of Israel were marked by the mass immigration of Holocaust survivors in the aftermath of the Holocaust and Jews fleeing Arab lands. Israel also has a large population of Ethiopian Jews, many of whom were airlifted to Israel in the late 1980s and early 1990s. Between 1974 and 1979 nearly 227,258 immigrants arrived in Israel, about half being from the Soviet Union. This period also saw an increase in immigration to Israel from Western Europe, Latin America, and North America.

A trickle of immigrants from other communities has also arrived, including Indian Jews and others, as well as some descendants of Ashkenazi Holocaust survivors who had settled in countries such as the United States, Argentina, Australia, Chile, and South Africa. Some Jews have emigrated from Israel elsewhere, because of economic problems or disillusionment with political conditions and the continuing Arab–Israeli conflict. Jewish Israeli emigrants are known as yordim.

 Diaspora (outside Israel) 

The waves of immigration to the United States and elsewhere at the turn of the 19th century, the founding of Zionism and later events, including pogroms in Imperial Russia (mostly within the Pale of Settlement in present-day Ukraine, Moldova, Belarus and eastern Poland), the massacre of European Jewry during the Holocaust, and the founding of the state of Israel, with the subsequent Jewish exodus from Arab lands, all resulted in substantial shifts in the population centers of world Jewry by the end of the 20th century.

More than half of the Jews live in the Diaspora (see Population table). Currently, the largest Jewish community outside Israel, and either the largest or second-largest Jewish community in the world, is located in the United States, with 5.2 million to 6.4 million Jews by various estimates. Elsewhere in the Americas, there are also large Jewish populations in Canada (315,000), Argentina (180,000–300,000), and Brazil (196,000–600,000), and smaller populations in Mexico, Uruguay, Venezuela, Chile, Colombia and several other countries (see History of the Jews in Latin America). According to a 2010 Pew Research Center study, about 470,000 people of Jewish heritage live in Latin-America and the Caribbean. Demographers disagree on whether the United States has a larger Jewish population than Israel, with many maintaining that Israel surpassed the United States in Jewish population during the 2000s, while others maintain that the United States still has the largest Jewish population in the world. Currently, a major national Jewish population survey is planned to ascertain whether or not Israel has overtaken the United States in Jewish population.

Western Europe's largest Jewish community, and the third-largest Jewish community in the world, can be found in France, home to between 483,000 and 500,000 Jews, the majority of whom are immigrants or refugees from North African countries such as Algeria, Morocco, and Tunisia (or their descendants). The United Kingdom has a Jewish community of 292,000. In Eastern Europe, the exact figures are difficult to establish. The number of Jews in Russia varies widely according to whether a source uses census data (which requires a person to choose a single nationality among choices that include "Russian" and "Jewish") or eligibility for immigration to Israel (which requires that a person have one or more Jewish grandparents). According to the latter criteria, the heads of the Russian Jewish community assert that up to 1.5 million Russians are eligible for aliyah. In Germany, the 102,000 Jews registered with the Jewish community are a slowly declining population, despite the immigration of tens of thousands of Jews from the former Soviet Union since the fall of the Berlin Wall. Thousands of Israelis also live in Germany, either permanently or temporarily, for economic reasons.

Prior to 1948, approximately 800,000 Jews were living in lands which now make up the Arab world (excluding Israel). Of these, just under two-thirds lived in the French-controlled Maghreb region, 15 to 20 percent in the Kingdom of Iraq, approximately 10 percent in the Kingdom of Egypt and approximately 7 percent in the Kingdom of Yemen. A further 200,000 lived in Pahlavi Iran and the Republic of Turkey. Today, around 26,000 Jews live in Arab countries and around 30,000 in Iran and Turkey. A small-scale exodus had begun in many countries in the early decades of the 20th century, although the only substantial aliyah came from Yemen and Syria. The exodus from Arab and Muslim countries took place primarily from 1948. The first large-scale exoduses took place in the late 1940s and early 1950s, primarily in Iraq, Yemen and Libya, with up to 90 percent of these communities leaving within a few years. The peak of the exodus from Egypt occurred in 1956. The exodus in the Maghreb countries peaked in the 1960s. Lebanon was the only Arab country to see a temporary increase in its Jewish population during this period, due to an influx of refugees from other Arab countries, although by the mid-1970s the Jewish community of Lebanon had also dwindled. In the aftermath of the exodus wave from Arab states, an additional migration of Iranian Jews peaked in the 1980s when around 80 percent of Iranian Jews left the country.

Outside Europe, the Americas, the Middle East, and the rest of Asia, there are significant Jewish populations in Australia (112,500) and South Africa (70,000). There is also a 6,800-strong community in New Zealand.

 Demographic changes 

 Assimilation 

Since at least the time of the Ancient Greeks, a proportion of Jews have assimilated into the wider non-Jewish society around them, by either choice or force, ceasing to practice Judaism and losing their Jewish identity. Assimilation took place in all areas, and during all time periods, with some Jewish communities, for example the Kaifeng Jews of China, disappearing entirely. The advent of the Jewish Enlightenment of the 18th century (see Haskalah) and the subsequent emancipation of the Jewish populations of Europe and America in the 19th century, accelerated the situation, encouraging Jews to increasingly participate in, and become part of, secular society. The result has been a growing trend of assimilation, as Jews marry non-Jewish spouses and stop participating in the Jewish community.

Rates of interreligious marriage vary widely: In the United States, it is just under 50 percent, in the United Kingdom, around 53 percent; in France; around 30 percent, and in Australia and Mexico, as low as 10 percent. In the United States, only about a third of children from intermarriages affiliate with Jewish religious practice. The result is that most countries in the Diaspora have steady or slightly declining religiously Jewish populations as Jews continue to assimilate into the countries in which they live.

 War and persecution 

The Jewish people and Judaism have experienced various persecutions throughout Jewish history. During Late Antiquity and the Early Middle Ages the Roman Empire (in its later phases known as the Byzantine Empire) repeatedly repressed the Jewish population, first by ejecting them from their homelands during the pagan Roman era and later by officially establishing them as second-class citizens during the Christian Roman era.Johnson (1987), pp. 164–65.

According to James Carroll, "Jews accounted for 10% of the total population of the Roman Empire. By that ratio, if other factors had not intervened, there would be 200 million Jews in the world today, instead of something like 13 million."

Later in medieval Western Europe, further persecutions of Jews by Christians occurred, notably during the Crusades—when Jews all over Germany were massacred—and a series of expulsions from the Kingdom of England, Germany, France, and, in the largest expulsion of all, Spain and Portugal after the Reconquista (the Catholic Reconquest of the Iberian Peninsula), where both unbaptized Sephardic Jews and the ruling Muslim Moors were expelled.

In the Papal States, which existed until 1870, Jews were required to live only in specified neighborhoods called ghettos.

Islam and Judaism have a complex relationship. Traditionally Jews and Christians living in Muslim lands, known as dhimmis, were allowed to practice their religions and administer their internal affairs, but they were subject to certain conditions. They had to pay the jizya (a per capita tax imposed on free adult non-Muslim males) to the Islamic state. Dhimmis had an inferior status under Islamic rule. They had several social and legal disabilities such as prohibitions against bearing arms or giving testimony in courts in cases involving Muslims. Many of the disabilities were highly symbolic. The one described by Bernard Lewis as "most degrading" was the requirement of distinctive clothing, not found in the Quran or hadith but invented in early medieval Baghdad; its enforcement was highly erratic. On the other hand, Jews rarely faced martyrdom or exile, or forced compulsion to change their religion, and they were mostly free in their choice of residence and profession.

Notable exceptions include the massacre of Jews and forcible conversion of some Jews by the rulers of the Almohad dynasty in Al-Andalus in the 12th century, as well as in Islamic Persia, and the forced confinement of Moroccan Jews to walled quarters known as mellahs beginning from the 15th century and especially in the early 19th century. In modern times, it has become commonplace for standard antisemitic themes to be conflated with anti-Zionist publications and pronouncements of Islamic movements such as Hezbollah and Hamas, in the pronouncements of various agencies of the Islamic Republic of Iran, and even in the newspapers and other publications of Turkish Refah Partisi."

Throughout history, many rulers, empires and nations have oppressed their Jewish populations or sought to eliminate them entirely. Methods employed ranged from expulsion to outright genocide; within nations, often the threat of these extreme methods was sufficient to silence dissent. The history of antisemitism includes the First Crusade which resulted in the massacre of Jews; the Spanish Inquisition (led by Tomás de Torquemada) and the Portuguese Inquisition, with their persecution and autos-da-fé against the New Christians and Marrano Jews; the Bohdan Chmielnicki Cossack massacres in Ukraine; the Pogroms backed by the Russian Tsars; as well as expulsions from Spain, Portugal, England, France, Germany, and other countries in which the Jews had settled. According to a 2008 study published in the American Journal of Human Genetics, 19.8 percent of the modern Iberian population has Sephardic Jewish ancestry, indicating that the number of conversos may have been much higher than originally thought.

The persecution reached a peak in Nazi Germany's Final Solution, which led to the Holocaust and the slaughter of approximately 6 million Jews. Of the world's 16 million Jews in 1939, almost 40% were murdered in the Holocaust. The Holocaust—the state-led systematic persecution and genocide of European Jews (and certain communities of North African Jews in European controlled North Africa) and other minority groups of Europe during World War II by Germany and its collaborators—remains the most notable modern-day persecution of Jews. The persecution and genocide were accomplished in stages. Legislation to remove the Jews from civil society was enacted years before the outbreak of World War II. Concentration camps were established in which inmates were used as slave labour until they died of exhaustion or disease. Where the Third Reich conquered new territory in Eastern Europe, specialized units called Einsatzgruppen murdered Jews and political opponents in mass shootings. Jews and Roma were crammed into ghettos before being transported hundreds of kilometres by freight train to extermination camps where, if they survived the journey, the majority of them were murdered in gas chambers. Virtually every arm of Germany's bureaucracy was involved in the logistics of the mass murder, turning the country into what one Holocaust scholar has called "a genocidal nation."

 Migrations 

Throughout Jewish history, Jews have repeatedly been directly or indirectly expelled from both their original homeland, the Land of Israel, and many of the areas in which they have settled. This experience as refugees has shaped Jewish identity and religious practice in many ways, and is thus a major element of Jewish history. The patriarch Abraham is described as a migrant to the land of Canaan from Ur of the Chaldees after an attempt on his life by King Nimrod. His descendants, the Children of Israel, in the Biblical story (whose historicity is uncertain) undertook the Exodus (meaning "departure" or "exit" in Greek) from ancient Egypt, as recorded in the Book of Exodus.

Centuries later, Assyrian policy was to deport and displace conquered peoples, and it is estimated some 4,500,000 among captive populations suffered this dislocation over three centuries of Assyrian rule. With regard to Israel, Tiglath-Pileser III claims he deported 80% of the population of Lower Galilee, some 13,520 people. Some 27,000 Israelites, 20 to 25% of the population of the Kingdom of Israel, were described as being deported by Sargon II, and were replaced by other deported populations and sent into permanent exile by Assyria, initially to the Upper Mesopotamian provinces of the Assyrian Empire. Between 10,000 and 80,000 people from the Kingdom of Judah were similarly exiled by Babylonia, but these people were then returned to Judea by Cyrus the Great of the Persian Achaemenid Empire.

Many Jews were exiled again by the Roman Empire. The 2,000 year dispersion of the Jewish diaspora beginning under the Roman Empire, as Jews were spread throughout the Roman world and, driven from land to land, settled wherever they could live freely enough to practice their religion. Over the course of the diaspora the center of Jewish life moved from Babylonia to the Iberian Peninsula to Poland to the United States and, as a result of Zionism, back to Israel.

There were also many expulsions of Jews during the Middle Ages and Enlightenment in Europe, including: 1290, 16,000 Jews were expelled from England, see the (Statute of Jewry); in 1396, 100,000 from France; in 1421, thousands were expelled from Austria. Many of these Jews settled in East-Central Europe, especially Poland. Following the Spanish Inquisition in 1492, the Spanish population of around 200,000 Sephardic Jews were expelled by the Spanish crown and Catholic church, followed by expulsions in 1493 in Sicily (37,000 Jews) and Portugal in 1496. The expelled Jews fled mainly to the Ottoman Empire, the Netherlands, and North Africa, others migrating to Southern Europe and the Middle East.

During the 19th century, France's policies of equal citizenship regardless of religion led to the immigration of Jews (especially from Eastern and Central Europe). This contributed to the arrival of millions of Jews in the New World. Over two million Eastern European Jews arrived in the United States from 1880 to 1925.

In summary, the pogroms in Eastern Europe, the rise of modern antisemitism, the Holocaust, as well as the rise of Arab nationalism, all served to fuel the movements and migrations of huge segments of Jewry from land to land and continent to continent until they arrived back in large numbers at their original historical homeland in Israel.

In the latest phase of migrations, the Islamic Revolution of Iran caused many Iranian Jews to flee Iran. Most found refuge in the US (particularly Los Angeles, California, and Long Island, New York) and Israel. Smaller communities of Persian Jews exist in Canada and Western Europe. Similarly, when the Soviet Union collapsed, many of the Jews in the affected territory (who had been refuseniks) were suddenly allowed to leave. This produced a wave of migration to Israel in the early 1990s.

 Growth 

Israel is the only country with a Jewish population that is consistently growing through natural population growth, although the Jewish populations of other countries, in Europe and North America, have recently increased through immigration. In the Diaspora, in almost every country the Jewish population in general is either declining or steady, but Orthodox and Haredi Jewish communities, whose members often shun birth control for religious reasons, have experienced rapid population growth.

Orthodox and Conservative Judaism discourage proselytism to non-Jews, but many Jewish groups have tried to reach out to the assimilated Jewish communities of the Diaspora in order for them to reconnect to their Jewish roots. Additionally, while in principle Reform Judaism favors seeking new members for the faith, this position has not translated into active proselytism, instead taking the form of an effort to reach out to non-Jewish spouses of intermarried couples.

There is also a trend of Orthodox movements reaching out to secular Jews in order to give them a stronger Jewish identity so there is less chance of intermarriage. As a result of the efforts by these and other Jewish groups over the past 25 years, there has been a trend (known as the Baal teshuva movement) for secular Jews to become more religiously observant, though the demographic implications of the trend are unknown. Additionally, there is also a growing rate of conversion to Jews by Choice of gentiles who make the decision to head in the direction of becoming Jews.

 Contributions 
Jews have made many contributions to humanity in a broad and diverse range of fields, including the sciences, arts, politics, and business. For example, over 20 percent of Nobel Prize laureates have been of Jewish descent, with multiple winners in each category.

 See also 

 Jewish studies
 Lists of Jews

 References 
 Notes 

Citations

 Further reading 

 Baron, Salo Wittmayer (1952). A Social and Religious History of the Jews, Volume II, Ancient Times, Part II. Philadelphia: Jewish Publication Society of America.
 
 
 
 
 
 
 
 
 
 
 
 
 
 
 Lewis, Bernard (1984). The Jews of Islam. Princeton: Princeton University Press. 
 Lewis, Bernard (1999). Semites and Anti-Semites: An Inquiry into Conflict and Prejudice. W. W. Norton & Co. 
 
 
 Poliakov, Leon (1974). The History of Anti-semitism. New York: The Vanguard Press.
 Ruderman, David B. Early Modern Jewry: A New Cultural History (Princeton University Press; 2010) 326 pages. Examines print culture, religion, and other realms in a history emphasizing the links among early modern Jewish communities from Venice and Kraków to Amsterdam and Smyrna.
 
 Stillman, Norman (1979). The Jews of Arab Lands: A History and Source Book. Philadelphia: Jewish Publication Society of America. 
 
 Vital, David. People Apart: The Jews in Europe, 1789–1939 (1999) 940pp highly detailed 
 

 External links 

 
 Official website of the Berman Jewish DataBank
 Official website of the Jewish Agency for Israel
 Official website of The Jewish Encyclopedia''
 Official website of the Jewish Telegraphic Agency
 Maps related to Jewish history 
 Official website of the World Jewish Congress

 
 
Ancient peoples of the Near East
Ethnic groups in East Africa
Ethnic groups in Europe
Ethnic groups in the Middle East
Ethnic groups in North Africa
Ethnic groups in South Asia
Ethno-cultural designations
Ethnoreligious groups
Israelites
Religious identity
Semitic-speaking peoples